The Korea Independence Party (KIP) was a political party in South Korea.

History
The party was established in Shanghai by Kim Koo in 1928, uniting a faction of conservative members of the Provisional Government of the Republic of Korea headed by Kim. When Kim was able to return to Korea in 1945, the KIP began operating in the country. Kim was initially supportive of Syngman Rhee, but a dispute over holding separate elections in South Korea (Kim was opposed, Rhee was for) led to a split and the party did not participate in the 1948 parliamentary elections in South Korea. However, Kim was a candidate in the indirect presidential elections in July 1948, losing heavily to Rhee.

When Kim was assassinated in 1949, the party went into a sharp decline. It participated in the 1950 parliamentary elections, but received only 0.3% of the vote, failing to win a seat. It received the same vote share in the 1960 elections, again failing to win a seat. It nominated Chun Jin-han as its candidate for the May 1967 presidential elections; he finished fifth in a field of six candidates with 2.1% of the vote. Despite increasing its vote share to 2.2% in the June 1967 parliamentary elections, the party remained seatless.

Election results

President

Vice President

Legislature

House of Representatives

House of Councillors

References

1928 establishments in China
1970 disestablishments in South Korea
Defunct political parties in South Korea
Confucian political parties
Conservative parties in South Korea
Hongik Ingan
Korean Confucianism
Korean independence movement
Korean nationalist parties
Political parties disestablished in 1970
Political parties established in 1928
Three Principles of the People